Rolf Kalmuczak (17 April 1938 in Nordhausen – 10 March 2007 in Garmisch-Partenkirchen) was a German author. He was an editor of daily papers, freelance contributor at Stern, lector and one of the authors of the Jerry Cotton series. Since 1966 he had used more than 100 pseudonyms, written some 160 youth books, 36 film scripts, 170 paperback crime novels, and 200 booklet-novels. He admits that he wrote the TKKG book series as "Stefan Wolf". Rolf Kalmuczak was married with one daughter and lived in Garmisch-Partenkirchen.

Pseudonyms

Best-known works 
The best-known works of the author published under the alias Stefan Wolf are the following youth book series:  
"Ein Fall für TKKG"
"Tom und Locke"
"Der Magier und das Power-Trio"
"Der Puma und seine Freunde"

External links
 

1938 births
2007 deaths
People from Nordhausen, Thuringia
German male writers